Waveform: The MKBHD Podcast (also referred to as Waveform or WVFRM) is a podcast hosted by American YouTuber Marques Brownlee with co-host Andrew Manganelli. The podcast focuses on consumer electronics news and products along with discussions on videos uploaded to Brownlee's channel. A number of episodes have involved interviews from YouTube creators and other guests including Craig Federighi, senior vice president at Apple Inc.

Background
Marques Brownlee, the creator of the popular technology-focused MKBHD YouTube channel, started the podcast to share some "behind the scene tips" and "unfiltered takes". Andrew Manganelli is the co-host of the podcast and has been a producer for the MKBHD YouTube channel since January 2017. Waveform is produced in part by the influencer agency Studio71.

The first episode was aired on Apple Podcasts and Spotify on July 31, 2019 and was a short 48 second announcement of the creation of the podcast. A week later, the first full length episode aired on August 9, 2019 followed by an announcement on the MKBHD YouTube channel on August 13, 2019.

Guests
Technology Youtuber Quinn from SnazzyLabs was the first guest on the podcast, appearing on the episode that aired October 4, 2019. Several technology company executives have appeared as guests, including Craig Federighi, Carl Pei, Chris Cox, Panos Panay, and Wallace Santos and Ron Reed from Maingear. An uncut interview with Mark Zuckerberg was uploaded after an edited version was uploaded to the MKBHD YouTube channel for the "Talking Tech" video series.

Release
All Waveform podcast episodes made before May 7, 2021 are audio only and are released on Apple podcasts, Spotify, and Google Podcasts. However, video highlights from an interview with Craig Federighi have been uploaded to the MKBHD YouTube channel.

Starting from May 7, 2021, the podcasts also became available in a video format with the launch of the Waveform YouTube channel. However, audio versions would continue to be available.

Reception
Brownlee was a finalist for Best Podcaster from the 2020 12th Shorty Awards for work on the Waveform Podcast.

References

External links
 Waveform: The MKBHD Podcast on Spotify
 Waveform Podcast YouTube channel.
 

2019 podcast debuts
Audio podcasts
Interview podcasts
Technology podcasts
Video podcasts
American podcasts